Christopher Anthony John Martin (born 2 March 1977) is an English singer-songwriter and musician. He is best known as the lead vocalist, pianist, rhythm guitarist and co-founder of the rock band Coldplay. Born in Exeter, Devon, he went to University College London, where he formed the band with classmates Jonny Buckland, Guy Berryman and Will Champion. They found worldwide fame with the release of the song "Yellow" in 2000, receiving acclaim for albums such as A Rush of Blood to the Head (2002), Viva la Vida or Death and All His Friends (2008) and others. He won seven Grammy Awards and nine Brit Awards as part of the band. They have sold over 100 million albums worldwide as of 2021, making them the most successful group of the 21st century. Martin appeared on Debrett's 2017 list of the most influential people in the United Kingdom.

Early life
Christopher Anthony John Martin was born on 2 March 1977 in Exeter, Devon, England, being the oldest of five children. His father, Anthony John Martin, of Whitestone House, Exeter, is a retired chartered accountant, and his mother, Alison Martin, who is from Zimbabwe, is a music teacher. His family's caravan and motorhome sales business, Martin's of Exeter, was founded in 1929 by his grandfather John Besley Martin, CBE (a High Sheriff-also Mayor in 1968 of Exeter). It was sold by his father to a former employee in 1999. William Willett, the man who campaigned for and made daylight saving time a recognised practice, was Martin's great-great-grandfather. Martin's paternal aunt Elisabeth Jane (daughter of John Besley Martin) married Hon. Julian George Winston Sandys, son of Conservative politician Duncan Sandys by his wife Diana Churchill, daughter of Prime Minister Winston Churchill. The Conservative politician David Martin is his paternal uncle.

Martin was educated at the pre-preparatory Hylton School and the preparatory Exeter Cathedral School, where he found his passion for music. After Exeter Cathedral School, Martin boarded at Sherborne School, where he met future Coldplay manager Phil Harvey. His education then continued in University College London where he attained an Ancient World Studies degree with first-class honours in Greek and Latin. At UCL, Martin met his future Coldplay bandmates Jonny Buckland, Guy Berryman, and Will Champion.

Career

Coldplay

Martin was responsible for co-founding the band along with Buckland; they met each other during UCL's orientation week in 1996. The pair spent the rest of the year planning a band and started to write their first songs together in early 1997, practising every night as well. Berryman joined the group in the following months and they recorded numerous demos without a drummer. By November, the trio was known as Big Fat Noises. In 1998, they became Starfish "in a panic", as Champion scheduled their debut live performance at The Laurel Tree only a few days after he joined the line-up. Weeks later, the band settled on the name Coldplay, which came from UCL friend Tim Crompton. He originally considered it for his own band after finding a copy of Philip Horky's Child's Reflections, Cold Play (1997), but the idea was ultimately discarded.

Since the release of their debut album Parachutes in 2000, the band have achieved internationally recognised fame and success. Their song "Yellow", from Parachutes, entered the charts at Number 4 and carried Coldplay to their aforementioned fame. To date, they have released nine studio albums in total including Parachutes, A Rush of Blood to the Head, X&Y, Viva la Vida or Death and All His Friends, Mylo Xyloto, Ghost Stories, A Head Full of Dreams, Everyday Life, and Music of the Spheres. They also released several EPs, including Safety and The Blue Room.

Solo work
Martin has written songs for a variety of acts including Embrace ("Gravity") and Jamelia ("See It in a Boy's Eyes", co-written with Coldplay producer Rik Simpson). Martin has also collaborated with Ron Sexsmith, Faultline, the Streets, and Ian McCulloch. He also sang a part of the vocals for the Band Aid 20 single "Do They Know It's Christmas?" at the end of 2004. In 2005, Martin collaborated with Nelly Furtado on the track "All Good Things (Come to an End)", for her 2006 album, Loose. The two were once rumoured to be a couple, after they both performed at Glastonbury in 2002. Nelly Furtado joked about it, saying, "Yeah, he's my boyfriend — he just doesn't know it yet".

Martin's fascination with hip hop was shown in mid-2006 when he collaborated with rapper Jay-Z for the rapper's comeback album, Kingdom Come, after the two met earlier in the year. Martin put some chords together for a song known as "Beach Chair" and sent them to Jay-Z who enlisted the help of hip-hop producer Dr. Dre to mix it. Coldplay producer Rik Simpson conceived and performed the drum beats. The song was performed on 27 September 2006 by the two during Jay-Z's European tour at Royal Albert Hall. Martin has also worked on a solo collaboration with Kanye West, with whom he shared an impromptu jam session during a 2006 concert at Abbey Road Studios. He performed the chorus of "Homecoming", from Kanye West's album Graduation.

In 2015, Martin collaborated with DJ Avicii to work on two new tracks for his album Stories. Their first collaboration was officially named "Heaven". Martin wrote the lyrics, Avicii did the production, and Simon Aldred of Cherry Ghost was the vocalist. He also provided the vocals for Avicii's True Believer, also in Stories. In February 2017, Martin performed "A Different Corner" at the 2017 Brit Awards in tribute to George Michael. 

A song he co-wrote called "Homesick" appears on Dua Lipa's self-titled debut album, which was released in June 2017. In 2019, Martin was featured on Avicii's posthumous album Tim. The song "Heaven" features vocals by Martin and was written by Avicii and Martin prior to Avicii's death.

Philanthropy
On 12 December 2012, Martin performed three songs, including "Losing My Religion" with Michael Stipe, as a part of the "12 12 12 Concert" which was held as a fundraiser for Hurricane Sandy relief. On 15 November 2014, Martin joined charity group Band Aid 30, performing alongside British and Irish pop acts on the latest version of the track "Do They Know It's Christmas?" at Sarm West Studios in Notting Hill, London to raise money for the 2014 Ebola crisis in Western Africa — this was the second time Martin has contributed to a Band Aid recording having performed in the 2004 version. Martin became the creative director of the newly established Global Citizen Festival in 2015, a role he plans to fulfil for 15 years.

Other projects
Martin and Coldplay guitarist Jonny Buckland made cameo appearances in the film Shaun of the Dead as supporters of the fictional charity ZombAid, with Martin having a second cameo in the film as a zombie. In 2006, Martin had a cameo role in the second series, episode four, of the Ricky Gervais and Stephen Merchant comedy Extras. He also appears singing in the closing credits of the 2009 Sacha Baron Cohen film Brüno, with Bono, Sting, Slash, Snoop Dogg, and Elton John.

In March 2015, Martin attended the televised launch of music streaming service Tidal via a video link, and revealed himself, along with other notable artists, as a shareholder in the company. In June 2015, Martin performed "Til Kingdom Come" at the funeral Mass of Beau Biden, son of United States Vice-president Joe Biden, after learning that Biden was a fan of his. In August 2017, Martin performed a live solo piano rendition of "Crawling" by Linkin Park. The performance was a tribute to Linkin Park's lead singer Chester Bennington, who died by suicide the previous month.

Influences
A major influence on Martin and Coldplay was the Scottish rock band Travis, with Martin crediting the band for the creation of his own band. The Irish rock band U2 is another important influence on Martin both musically and politically. Martin wrote for Rolling Stone Magazine'''s "100 Greatest Artists of All Time" on the band, saying: "I don't buy weekend tickets to Ireland and hang out in front of their gates, but U2 are the only band whose entire catalogue I know by heart. The first song on The Unforgettable Fire, "A Sort of Homecoming", I know backward and forward—it's so rousing, brilliant, and beautiful. It's one of the first songs I played to my unborn baby." Martin and Coldplay were also greatly influenced by the English rock band Radiohead. Speaking to Rolling Stone Magazine, Martin said of Radiohead: "Sometimes I feel like they cleared a path with a machete, and we came afterward and put up a strip mall... I would still give my left ball to write anything as good as OK Computer."Martin is very vocal about his love for Norwegian synth-pop band A-ha. In 2005, he stated in an interview: "I found myself in Amsterdam the other day and I put A-ha's first record on. I just remembered how much I loved it. It's incredible songwriting. Everyone asks what inspired us, what we've been trying to steal from and what we listened to as we were growing up — the first band I ever loved was A-ha." Martin has also performed live together with Magne Furuholmen of A-ha, introducing him as "the best keyboard player in the world". In November 2011, he stated that "back when we didn't have any hits of our own we used to play a-ha songs."

Martin is also a fan of English rock bands Oasis and Muse, Irish pop group Westlife, English-Irish girl group Girls Aloud, English pop group Take That, and Canadian indie rock band Arcade Fire. In 2014, Martin inducted Peter Gabriel into the Rock and Roll Hall of Fame for his solo career, and performed live with him.

Coldplay performed R.E.M.'s "Nightswimming" with Michael Stipe during their Austin City Limits performance in 2005, as a part of the Twisted Logic Tour. Martin went on to call "Nightswimming" "the greatest song ever written". He has called Richard Ashcroft, formerly of the Verve, "the best singer in the world". He also admires the lyrics of Morrissey. Martin was quoted as calling Coldplay's song "Shiver" a rip-off Jeff Buckley influenced by Buckley's song "Grace". In 2008, Coldplay released an alternate music video for Viva la Vida, directed by Anton Corbijn as a tribute to Corbijn's 1990 video for Depeche Mode's "Enjoy the Silence". It shows Martin dressed as a king, as Dave Gahan was in the original video. The band stated: "This is our attempt at a video cover version, made out of love for Depeche Mode and the genius of Anton Corbijn".

Personal life
According to an article released by The Times in May 2022, Martin has an estimated net worth of £132 million. In a 2012 interview with the Daily Mirror, Martin revealed that he had been suffering from tinnitus since his early adult years, although he said that he had noticed the symptoms even as a teenager "while listening to loud music". As a result, Martin wears specially filtered earplugs or customised in-ear monitors while performing and has encouraged his bandmates to do the same as a preventive measure. Similarly, he has encouraged his children to wear hearing protection at concerts. Martin has also become an advocate for hearing loss awareness, having partnered with the Royal National Institute for Deaf People. PETA named Martin the World's Sexiest Vegetarian in 2005. However, he began eating meat again after his separation from Gwyneth Paltrow. 

Martin is a supporter of Exeter City. He is also ambidextrous. In February 2020, a cassette tape was discovered by a former fellow pupil of Martin's. It contained a three-minute instrumental piece entitled "Electric Thunder", which was composed by Martin, aged 12, at Exeter Cathedral School. Martin played keyboards on the track accompanying other pupils performing in a group called Grandisson Ensemble. The cassette was expected to sell for £600 at auction. 

Relationships
According to one source, Martin previously had a relationship with live events producer Lily Sobhani around the Parachutes album release. He and American actress Gwyneth Paltrow married on 5 December 2003 in a quiet ceremony in the presence of their friends and family. Their daughter Apple was born in May 2004 in London. Martin and the band released a song called "I am your baby's daddy" under the name "the Nappies" in anticipation of her birth. Coldplay's "Speed of Sound" was also inspired by Martin's experience and awe at becoming a father, being the lead single for the band's X&Y album. 

Simon Pegg and Martin's bandmate Jonny Buckland are his daughter's godfathers, and Martin is godfather to Pegg's daughter. His second child, Moses, was born in April 2006 in New York City. The name was inspired by a song of the same name that he wrote for Paltrow. In March 2014, Martin and Paltrow announced their separation as a "conscious uncoupling" after ten years of marriage. Paltrow filed for divorce in April 2015 and it was finalised on 14 July 2016. 

From August 2015 to August 2017, he was in an on-and-off relationship with actress Annabelle Wallis. Since October 2017, Martin has been in a relationship with American actress Dakota Johnson. They reside in Malibu, California.

Politics

Martin has been particularly outspoken on issues of fair trade and has campaigned for Oxfam's Make Trade Fair campaign. He travelled to Ghana and Haiti to meet farmers and view the effects of unfair trade practices. When performing he usually has variations of "Make Trade Fair", "MTF" or an equal sign written on the back of his left hand and the letters "MTF" can be seen emblazoned on his piano.
He was a vocal critic of US President George W. Bush and the war in Iraq. During the Teenage Cancer Trust show at London's Royal Albert Hall on 24 March 2003, he encouraged the sell-out crowd to "sing against war". He was a strong supporter of Democratic presidential nominee John Kerry, most notably during his acceptance speech for the 2004 Grammy Awards Record of the Year, accepting for "Clocks". He supported Obama for president in 2008, giving a shout-out at the end of a performance of "Yellow" on 25 October 2008 episode of Saturday Night Live.

On 1 April 2006, The Guardian reported that Martin was backing the British Conservative Party leader David Cameron, and had written a new theme song for the party titled "Talk to David"."Talk to David" The Guardian; retrieved 26 April 2006. This was later revealed to be an April Fool's joke. While touring Australia in March 2009, Martin and the rest of Coldplay were the opening act at the Sound Relief benefit concert at the Sydney Cricket Ground in Sydney, for the victims of bushfires and floods in Victoria and Queensland. Martin appeared in a video for the "Robin Hood Tax" campaign, which proposes a tax on stock trades in the United States. This tax is aimed at levelling the field between the 1% and 99%. In June 2016, Martin supported Vote Remain in the United Kingdom European Union membership referendum.

Discography
With Coldplay

 Parachutes (2000)
 A Rush of Blood to the Head (2002)
 X&Y (2005)
 Viva la Vida or Death and All His Friends (2008)
 Mylo Xyloto (2011)
 Ghost Stories (2014)
 A Head Full of Dreams (2015)
 Everyday Life (2019)
 Music of the Spheres'' (2021)

Solo credits

Filmography

Television

Films

See also
 List of people associated with University College London
 List of British Grammy winners and nominees
 List of best-selling music artists
 List of highest-grossing live music artists
 List of artists who reached number one on the UK Singles Chart
 List of Billboard Hot 100 number-ones by British artists

Notes

References

Further reading

External links

 
 Coldplay Official Website
 Coldplay on AllMusic

1977 births
Living people
20th-century British guitarists
20th-century English male musicians
20th-century English singers
21st-century British guitarists
21st-century English male musicians
21st-century English singers
Alternative rock guitarists
Alternative rock pianists
Alternative rock singers
Alumni of University College London
Atlantic Records artists
British alternative rock musicians
British male pianists
British male songwriters
Capitol Records artists
Coldplay members
English anti–Iraq War activists
English baritones
English expatriates in the United States
English male guitarists
English male singers
English male singer-songwriters
English multi-instrumentalists
English people of Zimbabwean descent
English philanthropists
English pop guitarists
English pop pianists
English pop rock singers
English pop singers
English record producers
English rock guitarists
English rock pianists
English rock singers
Liberal Democrats (UK) people
Musicians from Exeter
Paltrow family
Parlophone artists
People educated at Exeter Cathedral School
People educated at Sherborne School
Rhythm guitarists